The 2020–21 season was the 100th season in the existence of Deportivo Alavés and the club's fifth consecutive season in the top flight of Spanish football. In addition to the domestic league, Alavés participated in this season's edition of the Copa del Rey. The season covered the period from 20 July 2020 to 30 June 2021, with the late start to the season due to the COVID-19 pandemic in Spain.

Players

First-team squad

Under contract

Reserve team

Out on loan

Transfers

In

Out

Pre-season and friendlies

Competitions

Overview

La Liga

League table

Results summary

Results by round

Matches
The league fixtures were announced on 31 August 2020.

Copa del Rey

Statistics

Appearances and goals
Last updated on 23 May 2021.

|-
! colspan=14 style=background:#dcdcdc; text-align:center|Goalkeepers

|-
! colspan=14 style=background:#dcdcdc; text-align:center|Defenders

|-
! colspan=14 style=background:#dcdcdc; text-align:center|Midfielders

|-
! colspan=14 style=background:#dcdcdc; text-align:center|Forwards

|-
! colspan=14 style=background:#dcdcdc; text-align:center| Players who have left the club during the season

|-
|}

Goalscorers

Notes

References

External links

Deportivo Alavés seasons
Deportivo Alavés